Daydream – Moorland (1983) is a soundtrack single by the German band Tangerine Dream for the episode  from the TV series Tatort (Crime Scene).  It is available only on 7" vinyl.

Track listing

References

1983 soundtrack albums
1983 EPs
Television soundtracks
Tangerine Dream soundtracks
Virgin Records soundtracks
Virgin Records EPs